Bee Ridge is a census-designated place (CDP) in Sarasota County, Florida, United States. The population was 9,598 at the 2010 U.S. Census. It is part of the North Port–Sarasota–Bradenton Metropolitan Statistical Area.

Geography

Demographics

As of the 2000 United States Census, there were 8,744 people, 3,905 households, and 2,456 families residing in the CDP. The racial makeup of the CDP was 97.30% White, 0.78% African American, 0.21% Native American, 0.67% Asian, 0.47% from other races, and 0.57% from two or more races. Hispanic or Latino of any race were 2.92% of the population.

There were 3,905 households, out of which 21.7% had children under the age of 18 living with them, 53.5% were married couples living together, 7.6% had a female householder with no husband present, and 37.1% were non-families. 32.1% of all households were made up of individuals, and 22.2% had someone living alone who was 65 years of age or older. The average household size was 2.18 and the average family size was 2.73.

In the CDP, the population was spread out, with 18.5% under the age of 18, 3.9% from 18 to 24, 19.3% from 25 to 44, 25.0% from 45 to 64, and 33.4% who were 65 years of age or older. The median age was 51 years. For every 100 females, there were 80.2 males. For every 100 females age 18 and over, there were 75.6 males.

The median income for a household in the CDP was $47,200, and the median income for a family was $56,386. Males had a median income of $36,215 versus $25,981 for females. The per capita income for the CDP was $26,716. About 3.4% of families and 5.5% of the population were below the poverty line, including 4.3% of those under age 18 and 4.5% of those age 65 or over.

References

Census-designated places in Sarasota County, Florida
Sarasota metropolitan area
Census-designated places in Florida